The geothermal areas of Yellowstone include several geyser basins in Yellowstone National Park as well as other geothermal features such as hot springs, mud pots, and fumaroles. The number of thermal features in Yellowstone is estimated at 10,000.  A study that was completed in 2011 found that a total of 1,283 geysers have erupted in Yellowstone, 465 of which are active during an average year.  These are distributed among nine geyser basins, with a few geysers found in smaller thermal areas throughout the Park.  The number of geysers in each geyser basin are as follows: Upper Geyser Basin (410), Midway Geyser Basin (59), Lower Geyser Basin (283), Norris Geyser Basin (193), West Thumb Geyser Basin (84), Gibbon Geyser Basin (24), Lone Star Geyser Basin (21), Shoshone Geyser Basin (107), Heart Lake Geyser Basin (69), other areas (33).  Although famous large geysers like Old Faithful are part of the total, most of Yellowstone's geysers are small, erupting to only a foot or two.  The hydrothermal system that supplies the geysers with hot water sits within an ancient active caldera.  Many of the thermal features in Yellowstone build up sinter, geyserite, or travertine deposits around and within them.

The various geyser basins are located where rainwater and snowmelt can percolate into the ground, get indirectly superheated by the underlying Yellowstone hotspot, and then erupt at the surface as geysers, hot springs, and fumaroles. Thus flat-bottomed valleys between ancient lava flows and glacial moraines are where most of the large geothermal areas are located. Smaller geothermal areas can be found where fault lines reach the surface, in places along the circular fracture zone around the caldera, and at the base of slopes that collect excess groundwater. Due to the Yellowstone Plateau's high elevation the average boiling temperature at Yellowstone's geyser basins is 199 °F (93 °C). When properly confined and close to the surface it can periodically release some of the built-up pressure in eruptions of hot water and steam that can reach up to 390 feet (120 m) into the air (see Steamboat Geyser, the world's tallest geyser). Water erupting from Yellowstone's geysers is superheated above that boiling point to an average of 204 °F (95.5 °C) as it leaves the vent. The water cools significantly while airborne and is no longer scalding hot by the time it strikes the ground, nearby boardwalks, or even spectators. Because of the high temperatures of the water in the features it is important that spectators remain on the boardwalks and designated trails. Several deaths have occurred in the park as a result of falls into hot springs.

Prehistoric Native American artifacts have been found at Mammoth Hot Springs and other geothermal areas in Yellowstone. Some accounts state that the early people used hot water from the geothermal features for bathing and cooking. In the 19th century Father Pierre-Jean De Smet reported that natives he interviewed thought that geyser eruptions were "the result of combat between the infernal spirits". The Lewis and Clark Expedition traveled north of the Yellowstone area in 1806. Local natives that they came upon seldom dared to enter what we now know is the caldera because of frequent loud noises that sounded like thunder and the belief that the spirits that possessed the area did not like human intrusion into their realm. The first white man known to travel into the caldera and see the geothermal features was John Colter, who had left the Lewis and Clark Expedition. He described what he saw as "hot spring brimstone". Beaver trapper Joseph Meek recounted in 1830 that the steam rising from the various geyser basins reminded him of smoke coming from industrial smokestacks on a cold winter morning in Pittsburgh, Pennsylvania. In the 1850s famed trapper Jim Bridger called it "the place where Hell bubbled up".

Types of features found in the park
This is actually below the solid volcanic rock and sediment that extends to a depth of 3,000 to 6,000 feet (900 to 1,800 m) and is inside the hot but mostly solid part of the pluton that contains Yellowstone's magma chamber. Hot springs and mudpots dot the landscape between the geyser basin and Shoshone Lake.

Hot Spring Basin is located 15 miles (24 km) north-northeast of Fishing Bridge and has one of Yellowstone's largest collections of hot springs and fumaroles. The geothermal features there release large amounts of sulfur. This makes water from the springs so acidic that it has dissolved holes in the pants of people who sit on wet ground and causes mounds of sulfur three feet (1 m) high to develop around fumaroles. The very hot acidic water and steam have also created voids in the ground that are only covered by a thin crust.

Mammoth Hot Springs

Mammoth Hot Springs is a large complex of hot springs on a hill of travertine in Yellowstone National Park adjacent to Fort Yellowstone and the Mammoth Hot Springs Historic District.  It was created over thousands of years as hot water from the spring cooled and deposited calcium carbonate (over two tons flow into Mammoth each day in a solution). Because of the huge amount of geothermal vents, travertine flourishes. Although these springs lie outside the caldera boundary, their energy has been attributed to the same magmatic system that fuels other Yellowstone geothermal areas.

Mud Volcano and Sulphur Caldron

The thermal features at Mud Volcano and Sulphur Caldron are primarily mud pots and fumaroles because the area is situated on a perched water system with little water available. Fumaroles or "steam vents" occur when the ground water boils away faster than it can be recharged. Also, the vapors are rich in sulfuric acid that leaches the rock, breaking it down into clay. Because no water washes away the acid or leached rock, it remains as sticky clay to form a mud pot. Hydrogen sulfide gas is present deep in the earth at Mud Volcano and is oxidized to sulfuric acid by microbial activity, which dissolves the surface soils to create pools and cones of clay and mud. Along with hydrogen sulfide, steam, carbon dioxide, and other gases explode through the layers of mud.

A series of shallow earthquakes associated with the volcanic activity in Yellowstone struck this area in 1978. Soil temperatures increased to nearly 200 °F (93 °C). The slope between Sizzling Basin and Mud Geyser, once covered with green grass and tree]s, became a barren landscape of fallen trees known as "the cooking hillside".

See also
 Mud volcano
 List of Yellowstone geothermal features
 Hydrothermal explosion

References
Bryan, T. Scott (1995). The Geysers of Yellowstone. Niwot, Colorado: University Press of Colorado. 
Harris, Ann G.; Tuttle, Esther; and Tuttle, Sherwood D. (1995). Geology of national parks: fifth edition. Iowa: Kendall/Hunt Publishing.

Notes

External links
 
 
 
 West Thumb Ranger Station, East of Old Faithful & north of Grant Village on Grand Loop Road, West Thumb, Teton, WY at the Historic American Buildings Survey (HABS)

 
Geysers of Wyoming
Hot springs of Wyoming
Volcanism of Wyoming
Landforms of Yellowstone National Park
Historic American Buildings Survey in Wyoming
Articles containing video clips